The secretary of state of New Jersey oversees the Department of State, which is one of the original state offices. The Secretary is responsible for overseeing artistic, cultural, and historical programs within the U.S. state of New Jersey, as well as volunteerism and community service projects within the state and is also the keeper of the Great Seal of the State.  The Secretary is appointed by the Governor.

The department's agencies include the State Archives, the New Jersey State Museum, the Division of Elections, the Division of Programs, the Business Action Center, the Council on the Arts, the Historical Commission, the Cultural Based Initiatives, the Center for Hispanic Research and Development, the Office for Planning Advocacy and the State Planning Commission. The Secretary of Higher Education, the Higher Education Student Assistance Authority, the State Library and the Sports and Exposition Authority are in but not of the department.

The New Jersey Division of Archives and Records Management, sometimes referred to simply as the "State Archives", is the repository for all vital statistics, including marriage and divorce records and birth certificates, and also maintains a separate set of files for the registry of wills. The Secretary of State oversees the Division of Tourism which advertises and promotes New Jersey as a premier travel destination and the Division of Elections, and sets all tourism and election policy.

The Secretary is the Chief Elections Officer of New Jersey.  Prior to April 1, 2008, the electoral division was under the New Jersey Attorney General. The Secretary of State is also the chair of the board of State Canvasser, which certifies election results for federal and state office elections and public questions.

In New Jersey, registry of corporations is not the responsibility of the Secretary of State.  The New Jersey Department of the Treasury is responsible for the maintenance of corporate records.

In New Jersey, the Secretary of State serves a term of office concurrent with that of the Governor. Although the conventional wisdom is that the Secretary of State cannot be removed from office except "for cause" by the Governor or by way of legislative impeachment, a recent law review article argues that the Governor does not have the authority to remove the Secretary of State "for cause," and this issue has not been tested.

The current Secretary of State is Tahesha Way.

List of officeholders 
Holders of the office of Secretary of State include:

External links
 Official website of the New Jersey Department of State
 New Jersey Division of Elections website
 Official website of the New Jersey Department of Archives and Records Management
 New Jersey State Museum website

References